61st was a station on the Chicago Transit Authority's Green Line. The station was located at 316 East 61st Street in the Washington Park neighborhood of Chicago. 61st was located south of 58th, which opened and closed at the same time as 61st, and north of King Drive. 61st opened on January 22, 1893; The station closed on January 9, 1994, when the entire Green Line closed for a renovation project, and did not reopen with the rest of the Green Line on May 12, 1996, due to service cuts, The station was later demolished and was located south from the 61st Yard.

References

CTA Green Line stations
Defunct Chicago "L" stations
Railway stations in the United States opened in 1893
Railway stations closed in 1994
1893 establishments in Illinois
1994 disestablishments in Illinois